Toxopeusomyia is a genus of flies in the family Stratiomyidae.

Species
Toxopeusomyia flavitarsis Lindner, 1957

References

Stratiomyidae
Brachycera genera
Taxa named by Erwin Lindner
Diptera of Australasia